Nokia 6700 may refer to:
Nokia 6700 classic
Nokia 6700 slide